The SsangYong Motor Company is a South Korea–based automobile manufacturer. It traces its origins back to a manufacturer established in 1954. The name SsangYong appeared in 1988, after its acquisition by the chaebol SsangYong Group. SsangYong Motor was then acquired by Daewoo Motors, SAIC Motor, and then Mahindra & Mahindra. In 2022, the company was acquired by the KG Group. The SsangYong name is planned to be dropped by the company in March 2023. 

The company main focus is sport utility vehicles (SUVs) and crossover SUVs and it is preparing for transitioning to electric cars.

History

Dong-A Motor (1954–1987)
SsangYong originally started out as two separate companies; Ha Dong-hwan Motor Workshop (established in 1954) and Dongbang Motor Co (established in 1962). In mid-1963, the two companies merged into Ha Dong-hwan Motor Co.. In 1964, Hadonghwan Motor Company started building jeeps for the US Army as well as trucks and buses. Beginning in 1976, Hadonghwan produced a variety of special purpose vehicles. After changing its name to Dong-A Motor in 1977 and taking control of Keohwa in 1984, it was taken over by SsangYong Business Group in 1986.

Gallery

Keohwa (1981–1984)

Keohwa, Ltd. was a South Korean assembler of Jeeps under licence, mainly for export markets. Its predecessor was the Jeep assembly joint venture of Shinjin Motors and American Motor Corporation (AMC), established in 1974. It was spun off as an independent company in 1981, after AMC left the venture and retired the permission to use the Jeep trade mark. In 1983, Jeeps from Keohwa started to be named as "Korando". In 1984, Keohwa was acquired by the predecessor of SsangYong Motor, Dong-A Motor.

SsangYong Motors (1986–present)
After Dong-A Motor was taken over by SsangYong Business Group, Dong-A Motor changed its name to SsangYong Motor in 1988. In 1987, it acquired United Kingdom-based specialty car maker Panther Westwinds.

In 1991, SsangYong started a technology partnership with Daimler-Benz. The deal was for SsangYong to develop a sport utility vehicle (SUV) with Mercedes-Benz technology. This was supposedly to allow SsangYong to gain footholds in new markets without having to build their own infrastructure (utilizing existing Mercedes-Benz networks) while giving Mercedes a competitor in the then-booming SUV market. This resulted in the Musso, which was sold first by Mercedes-Benz and later by SsangYong.

SsangYong further benefited from this alliance, long after Daimler-Benz stopped selling the Musso, producing a badge engineered version of the Mercedes-Benz MB100, the Istana and using Daimler designs in many other models, including the second-generation Korando (engine and transmission), the Rexton (transmission), the Chairman H (chassis and transmission) and the Kyron (transmission).

Takeover by Daewoo Motors and SAIC 
In 1997, Daewoo Motors, now GM Korea, bought a controlling stake from the SsangYong Group, only to sell it off again in 2000, because the conglomerate ran into deep financial troubles. In late 2004, the Chinese automobile manufacturer SAIC took a 51% stake of SsangYong Motor Company. In July - August 2006, workers went on strike for 7 weeks to protest SAIC's plans to lay off 554 employees. The strike cost SsangYong 380 billion Won and negotiations ended with workers accepting a wage freeze.

In January 2009, after recording a $75.42 million loss, the company was put into receivership. This may have been due to the global economic crisis and shrinking demand. In response to management's plan to cut 2,600 jobs, a third of the workforce, workers at Ssangyong's main factory stopped work and barricaded themselves inside in protest. One elderly worker died from a cerebral hemorrhage within the first 12 days. The strikes grew violent after water, food, electricity, and medicine were withheld from the strikers and police surrounded the building. Strikers threw Molotov cocktails at police while police used electroshock weapons and allegedly dropped corrosive chemicals on the strikers. On August 14, 2009, worker strikes finished at the SsangYong factory and production commenced again after 77 days of disruption. Company employees and analysts have also blamed SAIC for stealing technology related to hybrid vehicles from the company and failing to live up to its promise of continued investment. SAIC denied allegations of technology theft by the company's employees. However, SAIC was charged by the South Korean prosecutor's office for violating company regulations and the South Korean law when it ordered and carried out the transfer of SsangYong's proprietary technology developed with South Korean government funding over to SAIC researchers.

In 2010, Daewoo Motor Sales was dropped by General Motors. The deal is non-exclusive, meaning SsangYong will also sell vehicles through private dealers.

Takeover by Mahindra Automotive 

In April 2010, the company released a statement citing interest of three to four local and foreign companies in acquiring SsangYong Motor Company, resulting in shares rising by 15%. The companies were later revealed to be Mahindra & Mahindra, Ruia Group, SM Aluminum, Seoul Investments and French-owned Renault Samsung Motors of South Korea. In August 2010, Mahindra & Mahindra Limited was chosen as the preferred bidder for SsangYong. The acquisition was completed in February 2011 and cost Mahindra US$463.6 million.

In 2015, SsangYong launched the Tivoli, its first car after Mahindra acquisition. Within a year of Tivoli's launch, the company reported its first net profit in 9 years. In 2017, SsangYong sold 106,677 units in domestic sales and 37,008 units in exports, setting a record high in 14 years since 2003, when its annual domestic sales stood at 131,283 units. Out of this, the Tivoli alone contributed over 50,000 units of domestic sales for the company. Mahindra XUV300, which was later launched in 2019 is built on Tivoli's platform, sharing many parts including several metal sheets.

Mahindra  also worked with its SsangYong subsidiary to introduce high performance electric vehicles in South Korea for mass-market sales. Mahindra and SsangYong increased their collaboration on engines and electric cars.

On 21 December 2020, SsangYong Motor filed for receivership after Mahindra cut funding to SsangYong due to its outstanding debt. Ssang Yong Motor spokesperson stated that the company owes a total of 315.3 billion won (US$285 million) in overdue debt to financial institutions.

Failed takeover by Edison Motors 
In October 2021, it was reported that SsangYong was set to be acquired by electric bus and truck maker Edison Motors which would lead to SsangYong exiting receivership. Edison Motors planned to introduce SsangYong vehicles into the United States, Mexico, and Canada markets by the mid-2020s. Edison Motors also intended to phase-out production and new car sales of fossil fuel-powered SsangYong vehicles by 2030, in favor of producing and selling only electric-powered vehicles by the latter, if acquired. In January 2022, the South Korean courts "approved" Edison Motors' acquisition plan, although the company would be kept in receivership until the transaction were completed. In March 2022, SsangYong said the Edison Motors takeover was cancelled as the latter failed making acquisition payments for that month.

In December 2021, SsangYong signed an agreement with the Chinese BYD Auto to co-develop battery systems for its first electric car (called U100) which would be launched in 2023.

Takeover by the KG Group
In June 2022, the Seoul Bankruptcy Court opted for a consortium (KG Mobility) led by the KG Group as the final bidder to take over SsangYong Motor. The consortium planned to pay 900 billion won ($699.5 million) for SsangYong. In August 2022, South Korea's Free Trade Commission approved KG Group acquisition of a 61% majority stake in SsangYong through the consortium. The acquisition payments were completed later that month. In September 2022, the Seoul Bankruptcy Court agreed to SsangYong's receivership exit plan, including issuing new shares in order to pay the creditors. The KG Group was set to start the process to exit SsangYong's receivership in early October and finish the acquisition process on (or before) 14 October, the SsangYong sale deadline. 
There also are plans to rename SsangYong. After delays, the consortium started the receivership exit procedures on 31 October by requesting the receivership termination to the Seoul Bankruptcy Court. The Court approved the receivership exit on 11 November, finalising the consortium's acquisition.

In December 2022, SsangYong's chairman  Kwak Jae-sun said it plans to remove the "SsangYong" name entirely in March 2023 by modifying the articles of association. The company is set to be renamed as "KG Mobility", adopting a new branding and using KG as its marque, to avoid the negative perception of the present name, bypassing its "painful image".

Facilities

Offices
 SsangYong Head Office - The Head office located in Pyeongtaek, South Korea. R&D Centre, Design Centre, and other departments are located in the Pyeongtaek office
 Seoul Office - Department under Head office is located in Yeoksam-dong, Seoul

Factories
Pyeongtaek Plant (South Korea) - Main factory. Produces a complete range.
Changwon Plant (South Korea) - Engine and parts factory.

Current model lineup

Former model lineup

See also

 Mahindra Group

References

External links

 

Vehicle manufacturing companies established in 1954
Car manufacturers of South Korea
Truck manufacturers of South Korea
Manufacturing companies based in Seoul
SAIC Motor
Mahindra Group
South Korean brands
Car brands
Luxury motor vehicle manufacturers
South Korean companies established in 1954
2011 mergers and acquisitions